Minsthorpe Community College is a coeducational secondary school with academy status in South Elmsall, West Yorkshire, England. It is specifically for students aged eleven to eighteen. It is situated on Minsthorpe Lane, in the Minsthorpe district north of the town.

History
It was opened in 1969 by the Duke of Edinburgh as an upper school - Minsthorpe High School, when Wakefield LEA operated a three-tier education system.

Facilities
Wakefield College has two adult education courses at the school, one being in Beauty Therapy. Minsthorpe Community College also has a day care centre on the site named "Happy Days Children's Centre" and a Sports and Fitness Centre open to the whole community as well as its students, who are aged 15 or above.

Alumni
 John Godber (1969–74 as Minsthorpe High) - also returned as a teacher, becoming Head of Drama.
 Claire Utley (1992–95 as Minsthorpe High) - England footballer.

Teachers
 David Hopkins (Humanities 1973–5) became Chief Advisor of School Standards at the DFES.

External links
 Minsthorpe Community College
 Video conferencing
 LEA website
 Training Centre
 School Meals
 Early picture of the school
 New buildings since 2005

Secondary schools in the City of Wakefield
Academies in the City of Wakefield